= Corisol =

Corisol may refer to:

- Cortisol
- Epinephrine, by the trade name Corisol
